The Ghost Breaker is a 1909 haunted house farcical play written by Paul Dickey and Charles W. Goddard, it was adapted into a 1940 film starring Bob Hope called The Ghost Breakers.

It had also been adapted in a 1914 film, The Ghost Breaker (1914 film) and a 1922 film, The Ghost Breaker (1922 film).  It later was the basis of the 1953 Martin and Lewis movie Scared Stiff and was also an  inspiration for the 1984 film Ghostbusters.

The play was also adapted in a 1915 book of the same name.

References

External links

  (from the novel)

1909 plays
American plays
Comedy plays